Agonum corvus is a species of ground beetle from Platyninae subfamily. It was described by John Lawrence LeConte in 1860 and is endemic to the United States.

References

External links
Agonum corvus on Bug Guide

Beetles described in 1860
Beetles of North America
corvus
Endemic fauna of the United States